Said Hajji (in Arabic: سعيد حجي) (Salé, 29 February 1912 – 2 March 1942) was a Moroccan journalist and thinker. He was known as the founder of the "Moroccan Nationalist Press". and was one of the first Moroccan journalists during the French Protectorate in Morocco.

His life
Said Hajji was born on 29 February 1912, in the old town of Salé, in Morocco, one month before the signing of the Treaty of Fes, marking the start of the French Protectorate in Morocco.

Said started to be interested in politics since a very young age, where he engaged with his brothers and friends in different initiatives, both in politics and journalism. Said was an active member of the Istiqlal Party, asking for the independence of Morocco. In 1937, he founded the Arabic-language newspaper Al-Maghrib ( Morocco), criticizing French colonialism. His newspaper was censored several times by the colonial authorities.

Said Hajji died young at the age of 30, due to a chronic condition. His legacy is still present in Morocco, especially in his hometown Salé, where a neighborhood is named after him, as well as a school and a cultural center.

References

External links 
 Website dedicated to Said Hajji
 Letter addressed by Said Hajji and his brother to the Rif Chieftan Abdelkrim Al Khattabi

Moroccan male journalists
Moroccan editors
1912 births
1942 deaths
People from Salé
20th-century journalists
Disease-related deaths in Morocco
20th-century Moroccan writers